Wang Yanqiu (869?/873?-930?/932?), courtesy name Yingzhi, known early in his army career as Du Yanqiu, known from 923 to 926 as Li Shaoqian, was a general of the Chinese Five Dynasties and Ten Kingdoms period states Later Liang and Later Tang.

Background 
Wang Yanqiu was born either in 869 or 873, during the reign of Emperor Xizong of Tang.  He was from the Tang eastern capital Luoyang — although the History of the Five Dynasties expressed some skepticism, indicating that the Luoyang origin was "self-claimed," while the New History of the Five Dynasties did not express such skepticism.  In his youth, much of the Luoyang region was overrun by agrarian rebellions, and he was taken captive by the army of one of the rebels, Qin Zongquan.  He later was taken in by a man named Du at Bian Prefecture (汴州, in modern Kaifeng, Henan) and adopted as a son, and therefore took on the family name of Du.

Du Yanqiu was said to be quite, brave, decisive, and not bogged down on details in his youth.  At that time, Zhu Quanzhong the military governor (Jiedushi) of Xuanwu Circuit (宣武, headquartered at Bian Prefecture) was recruiting a new corps of soldiers known as the Tingzi Corps, and in doing so, was intentionally choosing the sons from wealthy families who had abilities and strength.  Du was selected to be a soldier in the Tingzi Corps.  (This implied that his adoptive father was a wealthy man.)  He subsequently served in Zhu's various campaigns and was eventually promoted to be the commander of the Tingzi Corps.

During Later Liang

During Emperor Taizu's and Zhu Yougui's reigns 
In 909, by which time Zhu Quanzhong had seized the Tang throne and established his own Later Liang as its Emperor Taizu, Du Yanqiu was given a general title.  Zhu Yougui sent Du and Huo Yanwei against the Longxiang mutineers.  Du and Huo defeated the mutineers and captured and executed Liu.  For this accomplishment, Du was made one of the commanders of the Left Longxiang Army.

During Zhu Zhen's reign 
In 913, Zhu Yougui was overthrown by his brother Zhu Youzhen the Prince of Jun, who then took the throne (and changed his name to Zhu Zhen).  He made Du Yanqiu the overall commander of the four Longxiang Armies.

In 916, shortly after the defeat of Later Liang's major general Liu Xun at the hands of archrival Jin's prince Li Cunxu, much of the Later Liang army was in a state of shock.  When Zhu Zhen subsequently ordered the officer Li Ba to take his 1,000 men to take position at Yangliu (楊劉, in modern Liaocheng, Shandong) to guard against a potential Jin attack, Li mutinied and attacked the palace.  Du happened to be guarding the palace at that time, and he fought Li's mutineers, defeating them.  For this accomplishment, he was made the prefect of Hui Prefecture (輝州, in modern Heze, Shandong).  He was soon made one of the generals of the army on the northern border with Jin.

In 923, the Later Liang general Duan Ning, trying to reverse years of Later Liang losses to Later Tang — i.e., Jin, as Li Cunxu had earlier in the year declared himself the emperor of a new Later Tang (as its Emperor Zhuangzong) — by drafting an ambitious four-pronged attack against Later Tang.  The main prong, which was to confront the Later Tang emperor himself, was to be commanded by Duan and Du.  However, as Duan was preparing to launch his planned attack, his army was stationed north of the Yellow River.  Emperor Zhuangzong took this opportunity to slide past Duan's army, defeat the weaker prong of the Later Liang attack commanded by Wang Yanzhang and Zhang Hanjie (張漢傑, brother of Zhu Zhen's deceased wife Consort Zhang), and head directly for Later Liang's undefended capital Daliang (i.e., Bian Prefecture).  Zhu Zhen, believing the situation to be hopeless, committed suicide, ending Later Liang.  However, prior to his suicide, he had sent messengers to Duan, ordering him to immediately return to Daliang to defend against the Later Tang attack.  Duan sent Du to be his forward commander in this operation.  Upon hearing of Zhu Zhen's death, Du surrendered to the Later Tang officer Li Congke at Fengqiu (封丘, in modern Xinxiang, Henan).  Duan subsequently surrendered to Later Tang as well.

During Later Tang

During Emperor Zhuangzong's reign 
Duan Ning and Du Yanqiu subsequently submitted a petition to Later Tang's Emperor Zhuangzong, accusing several Later Liang officials — Zhu Zhen's sister's husband Zhao Yan, Zhao Gu, Zhang Xiyi, Zhang Hanjie, Zhang Hanjie's cousins Zhang Hanlun and Zhang Hanrong, and Zhu Gui — of corruption, leading to Later Liang's fall; they suggested that Emperor Zhuangzong execute these officials.  Emperor Zhuangzong agreed, and adding to the list the senior Later Liang advisors Jing Xiang and Li Zhen, as well as Yelü Salaabo, the younger brother to Khitan Empire's Emperor Taizu (who had betrayed both Khitan and Later Tang previously).  He subsequently bestowed the imperial clan surname of Li on Du Yanqiu and also gave him a new name of Shaoqian.  In 924, after Li Shaoqian followed another former Later Liang general, Huo Yanwei, in defending against a Khitan attack, he was made the defender (防禦使, Fanyushi) of Qi Prefecture (齊州, in modern Jinan, Shandong).

By 926, the Later Tang realm was overrun with mutinies after he had killed the major generals Guo Chongtao and Zhu Youqian, angering the troops.  One of the main mutinies was led by another major general, Emperor Zhuangzong's adoptive brother Li Siyuan.  As Li Siyuan headed from Yedu (鄴都, in modern Handan, Hebei) south toward the imperial capital Luoyang, he sent messengers to summon Li Shaoqian, Li Shaoqin (i.e., Duan Ning, whom Emperor Zhuangzong had similarly given new names), and Li Shaoying, who were all then stationed at Waqiao (瓦橋, in modern Baoding, Hebei) to defend against a potential Khitan attack, asking them to follow him, and they did.  By the time that they reached Li Siyuan's army, Li Siyuan had already entered Bian Prefecture and was continuing on toward Luoyang, and they followed him.  Emperor Zhuangzong was shortly after killed in another mutiny at Luoyang itself, and Li Siyuan entered Luoyang, initially claiming the title of regent, and later emperor (as Emperor Mingzong).

During Emperor Mingzong's reign 
Shortly after Emperor Mingzong took the throne, a number of generals whom Emperor Zhuangzong had bestowed imperial clan names on requested to have their original names restored.  Emperor Mingzong approved of the requests, and Li Shaoqian took the opportunity not only to restore the original name of Yanqiu, but also his original family name of Wang.  For his contributions to Emperor Mingzong's rebellion, he was made the military governor of Guide Circuit (歸德, headquartered in modern Shangqiu, Henan).

In 927, Emperor Mingzong made Wang the deputy commander of the army in the north, defending against the Khitan, stationed at Mancheng (滿城, in modern Baoding).

Meanwhile, for several years, Wang Du the military governor of Yiwu Circuit (義武, headquartered in modern Baoding) had been holding the circuit semi-independently, as the circuit had been for decades late in Tang Dynasty, including commissioning his own circuit prefects and keeping his own tax revenues.  Emperor Mingzong, however, had long despised Wang Du for having taken over Yiwu after overthrowing his adoptive father Wang Chuzhi in 921.  Further, Emperor Mingzong's chief of staff An Chonghui had been trying to reimpose imperial laws on Yiwu, leading to friction between the imperial government and Wang Du.  Wang Du also feared the fact that Later Tang imperial troops were repeatedly passing through his circuit due to Khitan incursions, believing that he might himself be attacked one day.  Wang Du therefore was trying to establish relationships with other military governors, trying to use the alliances to affirm his own independence.  One of the military governors that he tried to contact was Wang Yanqiu, but Wang Yanqiu refused his overtures.  He tried to use money to entice Wang Yanqiu's subordinates to assassinate Wang Yanqiu, and Wang Yanqiu discovered this and then submitted evidence to Emperor Mingzong.  In summer 928, Emperor Mingzong ordered a general campaign against Wang Du, and shortly after put Wang Yanqiu in charge of the operations, assisted by An Shentong the military governor of Henghai Circuit (橫海, headquartered in modern Cangzhou, Hebei).

Shortly after, Wang Yanqiu put Yiwu's capital Ding Prefecture under siege, and then defeated the Khitan relief force commanded by the Khitan general Tunei, as Wang Du had requested aid from Khitan.  Tunei was forced to enter the city to defend it with Wang Du.  As Ding Prefecture had secure defenses, Wang Yanqiu decided not to attack it directly, and instead built a temporary headquarters nearby, collecting the tax revenues from Yiwu's three prefectures and preparing for a long siege.  He also defeated a second and a third Khitan relief force and continued the siege thereafter.  However, his subordinates Zhu Hongzhao and Zhang Qianzhao both considered him overly meek in this regard and submitted reports to Emperor Mingzong to that effect, and Emperor Mingzong ordered a direct attack.  Wang Yanqiu therefore did so, and the direct attack caused him to suffer 3,000 casualties.  When another imperial messenger arrived, ordering continued attacks, Wang Yanqiu showed the imperial messenger around the walls of Ding Prefecture, pointing that the defense was so secure that a direct attack would merely cause casualties.  Emperor Mingzong thus agreed with his strategy of a long-term siege.  It was said that throughout this long-term siege, Wang Yanqiu expended his own funds to supply the soldiers and did not kill any of his soldiers himself.

By spring 929, Ding Prefecture was in a desperate state.  Wang Du and Tunei attempted to fight their way out of the siege, but could not.  Wang Du's officer Ma Rangneng thereafter opened the city to welcome the imperial forces in.  Wang Du, finding the situation hopeless, committed suicide, along with his family.  Tunei was captured and then executed.  For this accomplishment, Wang Yanqiu was made the military governor of Tianping Circuit (天平, headquartered in modern Tai'an, Shandong) and given the honorary chancellor designation of Shizhong.  When he subsequently arrived at Luoyang to pay homage to Emperor Mingzong, Emperor Mingzong praised him.  He did not claim any contributions, other than to apologize for the siege taking too long.

Shortly after, Wang Yanqiu was moved to Pinglu Circuit (平盧, headquartered in modern Weifang, Shandong) and given the honorary chancellor designation of Zhongshu Ling.  He died while still serving at Pinglu, possibly in 932.

Notes and references 

 History of the Five Dynasties, vol. 64.
 New History of the Five Dynasties, vol 46.
 Zizhi Tongjian, vols. 268, 269, 272, 274, 275, 276.

9th-century births
930s deaths
Year of birth unknown
Politicians from Luoyang
Later Liang (Five Dynasties) generals
Later Tang jiedushi of Guide Circuit
Later Tang jiedushi of Tianping Circuit
Later Tang jiedushi of Pinglu Circuit
Later Liang (Five Dynasties) people born during Tang
Qin Zongquan's state
Generals from Henan